The Georgetown and Lane's Railroad was a Southeastern railroad that served South Carolina following Reconstruction.

History
The Georgetown and Lane's Railroad Company was chartered by the South Carolina General Assembly in 1881, and began operation two years later. In 1885, it went into receivership and was sold at foreclosure a year later. Afterward, the line was renamed the Georgetown and Western Railroad.

In May 1915, the Georgetown and Western Railroad was absorbed by the Carolina, Atlantic and Western Railroad, which became part of Seaboard Air Line Railway later that year.

References

Defunct South Carolina railroads
Railway companies established in 1881
Railway companies disestablished in 1887
1881 establishments in South Carolina